Flaveria kochiana is a rare Mexican plant species of Flaveria within the family Asteraceae. It has been found only in the State of Oaxaca in southwestern Mexico.

One plant can produce numerous small yellow flower heads densely packed in a tight clump. Each head contains 2-4 disc flowers plus usually a few ray flowers, though some heads lack rays.

References 

kochiana
Endemic flora of Mexico
Flora of Oaxaca
Plants described in 1995